What's It For? was an American panel quiz show that aired on the NBC television network during the fall of 1957, Saturday nights at 10 p.m. It was hosted by Hal March and sponsored by Revlon. March also hosted The $64,000 Question on CBS at the time, with Revlon as sponsor as well.

Premise
The show involved a panel which supposedly had to determine the purpose of a specific invention. Entertainment Productions' "teleshow" suffered on the ratings as it competed with Gunsmoke on CBS. What's It For? last aired until late 1957, when it was replaced in its time period by Ted Mack's The Original Amateur Hour.

Episode status
As of 2012, no episodes of the program are known to survive.

External links
 

1957 American television series debuts
1957 American television series endings
Black-and-white American television shows
Lost television shows
English-language television shows
1950s American game shows
NBC original programming